Benjamin Jakub Bilski (born 11 August 1988) is a former professional German swimmer of Polish origin, the 2009 World Games bronze medalist. Also a FinTech businessman, a founder and a board member of The NAGA Group AG.

Biography

Early years 
Benjamin "Ben" Bilski grew up in Frankfurt. His family is from Wrocław region.

He now resides in Hamburg.

Education 
He graduated from the Wiesbaden Carl-von-Ossietzky-Gymnasium in 2008. 
In 2010, after finishing his swimming career, he started studying BA in accadis Hochschule Bad Homburg.
In 2013 he started his MA program in the EBS University of Business and Law. Next year he graduated with a Master's degree in Management. 
He was on the list in 2018 Forbes 30 under 30 (Category Technology)

Sporting career 
Benjamin officially entered competitive swimming in November, 2002, at the age of 14. He began swimming in SG Wetterau. In 2004 he was accepted to the German national team. Throughout his career, Bilski has won several regional and Southern German championships.

He reached a pinnacle in his sporting career in 2009 with a bronze medal of the IOC-backed World Games in Kaohsiung with the German record. Next year Bilski finished his professional career. “I was never a high flyer, but I had a steady development” – Benjamin Bilski commented at the end of his swimming career.

Achievements 
German Junior Champion in 200 m freestyle (2006)
5th at the European Junior Swimming Championship, Mallorca (2006)
German Runner-up in 200 m butterfly (2008)
7th in 200 m freestyle, World Cup in Berlin (2008)
German champion in 4x200 m freestyle relay, Berlin (2008)
German Runner-up in 200 m butterfly (2009)
3rd in 200 m backstroke at the German Short Course Championship (2009)
Winner in German team standings for SC Wiesbaden (2008)
3rd in 200 m obstacle swimming course at the 2009 World Games in Kaohsiung, with the German record (1:57,00 min).

Record

References 

1988 births
Living people
German male swimmers
World Games bronze medalists
Sportspeople from Frankfurt
Sportspeople from Hamburg
21st-century German businesspeople
German chairpersons of corporations
German corporate directors
German libertarians
German investors
German people of Polish descent
German philanthropists
Competitors at the 2009 World Games
German lifesaving athletes